The Temptress is a 1926 American silent romantic drama film directed by Fred Niblo and starring  Greta Garbo, Antonio Moreno, Lionel Barrymore, and Roy D'Arcy. It premiered on October 10, 1926. The film melodrama was based on a novel by Vicente Blasco Ibáñez adapted for the screen by Dorothy Farnum.

Plot summary

Cast

 Greta Garbo as Elena, who uses her physical beauty to "tempt" and manipulate the opposite sex. 
 Antonio Moreno as Manuel Robledo, is an Argentine engineer on leave in Paris from a dam building project back home in Argentina. 
 Marc McDermott as Fontenoy,  middle-aged banker who had an affair with Elena during a difficult period and eventually commits suicide in a highly melodramatic fashion by drinking poisoned wine in public. 
 Lionel Barrymore as Canterac
 Armand Kaliz as Marquis de Torre Bianca, a Frenchman and the husband of Elena, but also the close friend of Robledo.
 Roy D'Arcy as Manos Duras, a local Argentine bandit who, like Robledo, falls for Elena when she arrives in Argentina.
 Robert Anderson as Pirovani
 Francis McDonald as Timateo
 Hector Sarno as Rojas
 Virginia Brown Faire as Celinda
 Steve Clemente as Salvadore (uncredited)
 Roy Coulson as Trinidad (uncredited)
 Louise Emmons as Newspaper Vendor (uncredited)
 Inez Gomez as Sebastiana (uncredited)
 Bob Kortman as Duras Henchman (uncredited)
 Ethan Laidlaw as Caballero (uncredited)
 Annabelle Magnus as Little Girl (uncredited)
 Chrispin Martin as Argentine Ranch Hand (uncredited)
 Louis Mercier as Newspaper Vendor (uncredited)
 Alys Murrell as Josephine (uncredited)
 Constantine Romanoff as Duras Henchman (uncredited)
 Charles Stevens as Argentine Reveler (uncredited)
 Mauritz Stiller as Undetermined Secondary Role (uncredited)

Production

Mauritz Stiller was originally set to direct Greta Garbo's second film for MGM. However, after struggling working as a director within the Hollywood studio system, he was removed from directing and replaced by Fred Niblo. The film's sets were designed by the art director James Basevi.

Despite its filming difficulties, The Temptress proved to be a success, showing early signs of Garbo’s career potential. It grossed $587,000 domestically and $378,000 internationally, its worldwide gross was $965,000, though loss $43,000.

After Louis B. Mayer viewed the finished picture, he was so depressed at the ending, that he ordered an alternate, happier ending to be made. Theaters at the time had the option of which ending to show, depending on what they felt were the tastes of their audience.

Reception
Mordaunt Hall said "In many respects this picture is a distinguished piece of work, wherein Fred Niblo, the director, keeps the audience on the qui vive. It is a photodrama in which the producers do not pander to popular appeal by portraying a happy ending."

Home media
The film was released on DVD on September 6, 2005 by Warner Home Video as part of the Greta Garbo collection also featuring the film Flesh and the Devil on the same disc. The alternate ending was included as well.

References

External links 

 
 
 
 

1926 films
American romantic drama films
1926 romantic drama films
American silent feature films
American black-and-white films
Films based on Spanish novels
Films based on works by Vicente Blasco Ibáñez
Films directed by Fred Niblo
Metro-Goldwyn-Mayer films
Films produced by Irving Thalberg
Films set in Paris
Films set in Argentina
1920s English-language films
1920s American films
Silent romantic drama films
Silent American drama films